
Murillo is a Spanish surname.  Notable people with the name include:

 Ander Murillo (born 1983), Spanish association football player
 Bartolomé Esteban Murillo (1617–1682), Spanish artist
 Catalina Murillo Valverde (born 1970), Costa Rican writer
 Jeison Murillo (born 1992), Colombian footballer
 Jesús Murillo Karam (born 1947), governor of Hidalgo and attorney-general of Mexico 
 Juan Murillo (born 1982), Venezuelan road cyclist
 Manuel Murillo Toro (1816–1880), Colombian president and writer
 Marino Murillo (born 1961), Cuban communist official
 Óscar Murillo (born 1988), Colombian footballer
 Oscar Murillo (artist) (born 1986), Colombian artist
 Pedro Domingo Murillo (1757–1810), independentist leader of Bolivia
  (1696–1753), Spanish Jesuit and cartographer of the Philippines
 Soledad Murillo (born 1956), Spanish academic and politician

Spanish-language surnames